Thomson Ferrans (May 13, 1916 in Scotland – October 21, 2006 in Rochester Hills, Michigan) was a U.S.-Scottish soccer defender. Ferrans earned three caps with the U.S. national team in 1937.

Youth
Was the youngest of 11 children, all of which were boys.  While born in Scotland, he grew up in Michigan, graduating from Detroit's Southwestern High School in 1933.

Club career
Ferrans played his club career in Michigan.  In 1939, he was a member of a Michigan All Star team which played the touring Scottish team.  In both 1941 and 1942, he was with Detroit Chrysler when they lost consecutive U.S. Challenge Cup championship games to the Pawtucket Rangers.  In the second game, he scored a penalty goal in the loss.

National team
Ferrans earned three caps with the U.S. national team in 1937.  All three were losses to Mexico in September.

Non-soccer career
Ferrans served in the U.S. Army in both World War II and the Korean War. After retiring from playing soccer, he lived rest of his life in Detroit and Warren, Michigan.  He was married to Agnes 'Nancy' Blair Graham (1919–1989) and had two children, Robert '49 and Barbara '52; and five grandchildren: Andrew '86, Samantha '87, Colleen '89, Ross '91, and Liam '95.  He died on October 21, 2006 in a Rochester Hills, Michigan nursing home at the age of ninety.

See also
List of United States men's international soccer players born outside the United States

References

External links
 Obituary

1916 births
2006 deaths
American soccer players
Scottish emigrants to the United States
United States men's international soccer players
Association football defenders